Farmington is a city in Dakota County, Minnesota, United States. The population was 23,632 at the 2020 census. It is a part of the Minneapolis-St. Paul metropolitan area.

History

Settlers began arriving in Empire Township, in which Farmington grew, in the early 1850s. The village of Dakota City began around the intersection of the Minnesota Central, Hastings, and Dakota railroads, and also the Vermillion River. The popular city train station in Dakota City was Farmington Station and non-residents began confusing the two names and identifying the town as Farmington. The town's name was then permanently changed from Dakota City to Farmington. The present name was given for the numerous farms near the original town site. Farmington received its village charter in 1872 making Farmington the second oldest community in Dakota County after the county seat, Hastings.

A notable event in Farmington's history is the movement of the Dakota County Fair to Farmington in 1869. Another event, the Great Fire of Farmington on November 22, 1879, destroyed several houses, stores, a hotel, and a grain elevator in the current downtown area.  The fire was started by a firework cart that was knocked over in a buggy accident. Farmington High School graduated its first class in 1884. Farmington was one of the first communities in the United States to offer rural free mail delivery in 1897.

The town continued to grow throughout the twentieth century. The city celebrated its centennial in 1972. In the recent past, the city has expanded to include several suburban neighborhoods north of the original downtown area. Farmington is still separated by Lakeville to the north and west by farms. However, the community continues to be incorporated in the expanding suburbs of the Minneapolis-St. Paul metropolitan area.

Farmington is home to three properties listed on the Register of Historic Places for Dakota County: the Daniel F. Akin House, the Church of the Advent, and the Exchange Bank Building.

Economy
Farmington is the location of the Minneapolis Air Route Traffic Control Center (ZMP) and a Marigold Kemps packing plant. Farmington is also home to the first entirely recycled Subway location.

Geography
A large majority of land was deemed unfit for housing development in 1962 due to excessive radon levels and contaminated ground water. Several hundreds of thousands of pounds of garbage were dumped on the land and used to insulate against the cancer causing radon.

Farmington borders the City of Lakeville to the west, Empire Township to the east, and the Townships of Castle Rock and Eureka to the south.

County Road 31/Pilot Knob, County Road 50, Minnesota Highway 50, and Minnesota Highway 3 are four of the main routes in Farmington.

Community

Farmington is host to The Dakota County Fairgrounds with entrances on 220th Street (Ash Street) and along Highway 3 (Chippendale Avenue). The Fairgrounds is the largest in area with  versus 300 for the next largest: The Minnesota State Fairgrounds. It also hosts the largest county fair attendance in the state, with average attendance now at 125,000 annually.

Farmington is a suburb of the Minneapolis/Saint Paul area and is largely of residential development. It can generally be divided into two (2) sections, the area of the town north of County Highway 50 and the area south of Highway 50. The area to the north has been widely developed in the last 18 years, while the area to the south is generally known as "Downtown" and has had only two major developments in the last 20 years. The third area of the city is the North-East Farmington/West Central Empire Township developments, with large areas of development in the recent 5 years. Farmington has many biking and walking trails integrated within its housing communities. The trail along the Vermillion River unites the downtown, uptown, and Empire Township neighborhoods.  Home to the native beavcoon.

Demographics

2010 census
As of the census of 2010, there were 21,086 people, 7,066 households, and 5,426 families living in the city. The racial makeup of the city was 89.8% White, 2.1% African American, 0.5% Native American, 3.6% Asian, 0.1% Pacific Islander, 1.1% from other races, and 2.8% from two or more races. Hispanic or Latino of any race were 3.6% of the population.

There were 7,066 households, of which 51.4% had children under the age of 18 living with them, 63.4% were married couples living together, 8.7% had a female householder with no husband present, 4.7% had a male householder with no wife present, and 23.2% were non-families. 17.7% of all households were made up of individuals, and 4.7% had someone living alone who was 65 years of age or older. The average household size was 2.95 and the average family size was 3.38.

The median age in the city was 31.6 years. 33.3% of residents were under the age of 18; 6.3% were between the ages of 18 and 24; 35.7% were from 25 to 44; 19% were from 45 to 64; and 5.6% were 65 years of age or older. The gender makeup of the city was 50.1% male and 49.9% female.

2000 census
As of the census of 2000, there were 12,365 people, 4,169 households, and 3,255 families living in the city. The racial makeup of the city was 95.62% Caucasian. 0.74% African American, 0.28% Native American, 1.46% Asian, 0.02% Pacific Islander, 0.59% from other races, and 1.28% from two or more races. Hispanic or Latino of any race were 1.88% of the population.

There were 4,169 households, out of which 51.0% had children under the age of 18 living with them, 67.4% were married couples living together, 7.2% had a female householder with no husband present, and 21.9% were non-families. 16.7% of all households were made up of individuals, and 6.0% had someone living alone who was 65 years of age or older. The average household size was 2.95 and the average family size was 3.35.

In the city, the population was spread out, with 34.0% under the age of 18, 6.5% from 18 to 24, 41.5% from 25 to 44, 12.4% from 45 to 64, and 5.6% who were 65 years of age or older. The median age was 30 years. For every 100 females, there were 101.7 males. For every 100 females age 18 and over, there were 99.5 males.

The median income for a household in the city was $61,864, and the median income for a family was $65,380. Males had a median income of $42,796 versus $30,373 for females. The per capita income for the city was $22,281. About 1.3% of families and 2.4% of the population were below the poverty line, including 2.6% of those under age 18 and 9.5% of those age 65 or over.

Education
Farmington schools are operated by ISD 192 and currently enroll approximately 6,900 students. The district range includes the cities of Farmington and the east portion of Lakeville, and the Townships of Castle Rock, Empire, and Eureka. The Farmington Senior High School mascot is Pouncer the Tiger and school colors are orange and black, with white occasionally included.

Politics
Farmington is located in Minnesota's 2nd congressional district, represented by Angie Craig. Farmington is represented in the Minnesota Senate by District 58 Senator Zach Duckworth, and in the Minnesota House by District 58B Representative Pat Garofalo.

Notable people
 Walter White, Minnesota state legislator and farmer.
 Steve Strachan, former member of the Farmington City Council, former member of the Minnesota House of Representatives, former sheriff of King County, Washington.
 James F. White, Minnesota state legislator and funeral director.
 Shauna Grant, pornographic actress and nude model.

References

External links

 City of Farmington – Official Website

Cities in Minnesota
Cities in Dakota County, Minnesota